Events in the year 1891 in Germany.

Incumbents

National level
 Kaiser – Wilhelm II
 Chancellor – Leo von Caprivi

State level

Kingdoms
 King of Bavaria – Otto of Bavaria
 King of Prussia – Kaiser Wilhelm II
 King of Saxony – Albert of Saxony
 King of Württemberg – Charles I of Württemberg to 6 October, then William II of Württemberg

Grand Duchies
 Grand Duke of Baden – Frederick I
 Grand Duke of Hesse – Louis IV
 Grand Duke of Mecklenburg-Schwerin – Frederick Francis III
 Grand Duke of Mecklenburg-Strelitz – Frederick William
 Grand Duke of Oldenburg – Peter II
 Grand Duke of Saxe-Weimar-Eisenach – Charles Alexander

Principalities
 Schaumburg-Lippe – Adolf I, Prince of Schaumburg-Lippe
 Schwarzburg-Rudolstadt – Günther Victor, Prince of Schwarzburg-Rudolstadt
 Schwarzburg-Sondershausen – Karl Günther, Prince of Schwarzburg-Sondershausen
 Principality of Lippe – Woldemar, Prince of Lippe
 Reuss Elder Line – Heinrich XXII, Prince Reuss of Greiz
 Reuss Younger Line – Heinrich XIV, Prince Reuss Younger Line
 Waldeck and Pyrmont – George Victor, Prince of Waldeck and Pyrmont

Duchies
 Duke of Anhalt – Frederick I, Duke of Anhalt
 Duke of Brunswick – Prince Albert of Prussia (regent)
 Duke of Saxe-Altenburg – Ernst I, Duke of Saxe-Altenburg
 Duke of Saxe-Coburg and Gotha – Ernst II, Duke of Saxe-Coburg and Gotha
 Duke of Saxe-Meiningen – Georg II, Duke of Saxe-Meiningen

Colonial Governors
 Cameroon (Kamerun) – from 7 August Bruno von Schuckmann (acting governor)
 German East Africa (Deutsch-Ostafrika) – Hermann Wissmann (commissioner) (1st term) to 21 February, then Julius Freiherr von Soden (with ... Rüdiger, acting governor)
 German New Guinea (Deutsch-Neuguinea) – Fritz Rose (commissioner)
 German South-West Africa (Deutsch-Südwestafrika) – Louis Nels (acting commissioner) to March, then Curt von François (commissioner)
 Togoland – Eugen von Zimmerer (commissioner) to 14 April, then vacant

Events
 23–24 January – 1891 European Figure Skating Championships in Hamburg

Undated
 German company Dr. Oetker is founded in Bielefeld.
 Robert Koch Institute is founded in Berlin.
 International Electrotechnical Exhibition in Frankfurt am Main
 The modern taximeter is invented by German Friedrich Wilhelm Gustav Bruhn.
 The Fischer projection is devised by Hermann Emil Fischer.
 August Thyssen und Joseph Thyssen found German steel company Thyssen.

Births

 8 January – Walther Bothe, German physicist (died 1957)
 24 January – Walter Model, German field marshal (died 1945)
 27 January – Wilhelm Morgner, German painter (died 1917)
 31 January – Kurt von Plettenberg, German forester (died 1945)
 14 February – Erich Engel, film and theatre director (died 1966)
 15 February – Josef Wintrich, German judge (died 1958)
 17 February – Abraham Fraenkel, Israeli mathematician and Zionist (died 1965)
 11 March – Gertrud Wolle, German film actress (died 1952)
 12 March – Hermann Stenner, German painter (died 1914)
 28 March – Peter Suhrkamp, German publisher (died 1959)
 2 April – Max Ernst, German painter (died 1976)
 13 May – Fritz Rasp, German actor (died 1976)
 13 May – Wilhelm Weskamm, German bishop of Roman Catholic Church (died 1956)
 22 May – Johannes R. Becher, German politician, poet and novelist (died 1958)
 21 June - Hermann Scherchen, German conductor (died 1966)
 14 July – Fritz Kampers, German actor (died 1950)
 14 July – Werner Rittberger, German figure skater (died 1975)
 29 July – Bernhard Zondek, Israeli gynecologist, developer of first reliable pregnancy test (died 1966)
 7 August – Johannes Joseph van der Velden, German bishop of Roman Catholic Church (died 1954)
 4 September – Fritz Todt, German engineer (died 1942)
 16 September – Karl Dönitz , German admiral who played a major role in the naval history of World War II (died 1980)
 22 September – Hans Albers, German actor (died 1960)
 9 October – Kurt von Tippelskirch, German general (died 1957)
 22 October – Carl-Hans Graf von Hardenberg, German politician and landowner (died 1958)
 25 October – Karl Elmendorff, German conductor (died 1962)
 14 November – Josef Magnus Wehner, German poet and playwright (died 1973)
 15 November – Erwin Rommel, German field marshal (died 1944)
 16 November – Julius Leber, German politician (died 1945)
 2 December – Otto Dix, German painter and forced Volkssturm conscript (died 1969)
 10 December – Nelly Sachs, German poet and playwright (died 1970)

Deaths

 26 January – Nicolaus Otto, German engineer and inventor (born 1832)
 27 February – Karl Eduard Heusner, German admiral (born 1843)
 14 March – Ludwig Windthorst, German politician (born 1812)
 24 April – Helmuth von Moltke the Elder, German field marshal, chief of staff of the Prussian Army for thirty years (born 1800)
 22 May – Ernst Julius Hähnel, German sculptor (born 1811)
 23 June – Wilhelm Eduard Weber, chemist (born 1804)
 21 June – Paul Bronsart von Schellendorff, general (born 1832)
 6 October – Charles I, King of Württemberg (born 1823)
 14 December – Ferdinand von Roemer, German geologist (born 1818)
 29 December – Leopold Kronecker, German mathematician (born 1823)

References

 
Years of the 19th century in Germany
Germany
Germany